Greenlawns School, Worli is a co-educational private school located in the Worli area of South Mumbai, India. It has a sister branch in Breach Candy (Greenlawns High School).

The school is situated in Worli just opposite the Bandra-Worli Sea Link.

The school has no divisions and only one class per grade system is followed.

References

Private schools in Mumbai
Educational institutions established in 1959
1959 establishments in Bombay State